This is a list of Belgian monarchs from 1831 when the first Belgian king, Leopold I, ascended the throne, after Belgium seceded from the Kingdom of the Netherlands during the Belgian Revolution of 1830.

Under the Belgian Constitution, the Belgian monarch is styled "King of the Belgians" rather than "King of Belgium" in order to reflect the monarchy's constitutional and popular function. 

Since 1831, there have been seven Kings of the Belgians and two regents.

List

Timeline

See also

Monarchy of Belgium
Family tree of Belgian monarchs
List of Belgian consorts
Line of succession to the Belgian throne
Crown Council of Belgium

References

External links

 Vanthemsche, Guy; De Peuter, Roger, eds. (2023), "Appendix: List of Rulers, Sovereigns and Heads of State (1419–Present) and of Governors General (1507–1794) of the Southern Low Countries and Belgium", A Concise History of Belgium, Cambridge Concise Histories, Cambridge: Cambridge University Press, pp. 357–360.

Rulers of Belgium
History of the Belgian Monarchy at Monarchie.be

Belgian monarchs, List of
Monarchs, List of Belgian
Monarchs, List of Belgian